Leapin' and Lopin is an album by jazz pianist Sonny Clark, released on Blue Note Records in May 1962. It was Clark's last album as a leader before his death in 1963. It features a guest appearance from sax player Ike Quebec, who was mounting a comeback after a decade of low visibility. The rhythm section of Clark, Butch Warren, and Billy Higgins would also appear on sessions with Dexter Gordon yielding his albums for Blue Note Go! and A Swingin' Affair.

Michael Nastos of Allmusic writes that "Top to bottom Leapin' and Lopin' is a definitive recording for Clark, and really for all time in the mainstream jazz idiom." All About Jazz stated, "Although pianist Sonny Clark had documented much fine music up to this point, one of his final recordings before an untimely death, everything seemed to solidify with this 1961 ringer."

Personnel
Sonny Clark — piano
Tommy Turrentine — trumpet (all tracks except "Deep in a Dream")
Charlie Rouse — tenor saxophone (all tracks except "Deep in a Dream")
Ike Quebec — tenor saxophone (on "Deep in a Dream")
Butch Warren — bass
Billy Higgins — drums

References

Sonny Clark albums
1962 albums
Blue Note Records albums
Albums produced by Alfred Lion